Flaminio Torre (1620–1661) was an Italian Baroque painter of the Bolognese School, active during the Baroque period.

He was a pupil of Guido Reni, Giacomo Cavedone, and Simone Cantarini.  He was also called Degli Ancinelli, and painted for churches in Bologna; including a Deposition from the Cross for S. Giorgio. Torre died in Modena. Among his pupils were Giulio (or Giuseppe) Cesare Milani, Giovanni Maria Viani, and Alessandro Badile.

References

1620 births
1661 deaths
17th-century Italian painters
Italian male painters
Painters from Bologna
Italian Baroque painters